Anneli Särnblad, born 1968, is a Swedish social democratic politician who has been a member of the Riksdag since 2002.

External links
 Anneli Särnblad at the Riksdag website

1968 births
Living people
Members of the Riksdag from the Social Democrats
Women members of the Riksdag
Members of the Riksdag 2002–2006
21st-century Swedish women politicians
Members of the Riksdag 2006–2010